Wieżyca  is a village in the administrative district of Gmina Stężyca, within Kartuzy County, Pomeranian Voivodeship, in northern Poland.

For details of the history of the region, see History of Pomerania.

References

External links 
 Lokalna Grupa Rybacka Kaszuby

Villages in Kartuzy County